Binga is a district on the south eastern shore of Lake Kariba in the province of Matabeleland North, Zimbabwe. Binga was built to rehouse the BaTonga people whose homelands were flooded when Lake Kariba was created. The district is one of the forgotten despite its leading treasures in tourism and wildlife resources in the country. Tourist attractions feature the general Zambezi River viewing, "The only sand beach in Zimbabwe", Hot springs, fishing, crocodile farm, game reserves, Chijalile Pass, Swamps in the Simatelele Ward area, several stunning gorges, natural rock outcrops to mention but a few. People in the district are not as poor and uneducated as heard of to the country. Roads are poor of course, farmland is limited but vegetation is still in its best condition when compared to most districts in the country. There are also coal, gas and oil deposits along the Muchesu Area hills. 

There is also commercial kapenta, bream, tilapia and tiger fish production in the district. Villagers do domestic fishing at family and individual level. Resort areas in the district also offer exclusive accommodation and wedding venues.

References

Populated places in Matabeleland North Province
Zambezi River
Lake Kariba